Kherbet Selm   is a village in southern Lebanon.

The municipality of Khirbet Selm is located in the Kaza of Bent Jbayl, one of the eight mohafazats (governorates) of Lebanon. Khirbet Selm is 104 kilometers (64.6256 mi) away from Beirut the capital of Lebanon. 
The village's elevation is 630 meters (2067.03 ft - 688.968 yd) above sea level. Khirbet Selm surface stretches for 379 hectares (12.60 km² - 9.46294 mi²).

Name
The name of the town means "the ruins of Selem". Khirbeh means ruins, and Selem is likely Salem, a Canaanite deity.

History
In 1875 Victor Guérin  described it: “In the middle of a deep and broad ravine the Wady el-Hadjr, a sort of rocky islet lying north and south. Oblong and narrow, it serves as the site of a village called Kh. Selem, which contains a population of 130 Metawileh.”

He further noted: “Here are found the remains of an ancient church, such as cut stones, shafts more or less broken, and a circular baptismal font. Here I also saw several Greek crosses engraved on lintels of doors, cisterns, presses cut in the rock, and even some houses still standing which may be older than the Mussulman invasion.”

In 1881, the PEF's Survey of Western Palestine (SWP)  described it:  “A village, built of stone,  containing 200 Metawileh, on ridge, with spring and cisterns ; arable cultivation around.”

They further noted: "South of the village there is a level area of rock, in the middle of which one column is standing. Another column and two or three pedestals form part of a wall on the west. There are no capitals. This was probably a Christian church. The columns are not well dressed."

References

Bibliography

External links
Survey of Western Palestine, Map 2:   IAA, Wikimedia commons
Khirbet Selm, Localiban 

Populated places in the Israeli security zone 1985–2000
Populated places in Bint Jbeil District
Shia Muslim communities in Lebanon